Juan Ríos Cantú (born 13 November 1974 in Reynosa, Tamaulipas), is a Mexican television actor.

Filmography

Films

Television roles

References

External links 
 

1972 births
Living people
Mexican male telenovela actors
Mexican male television actors
Male actors from Tamaulipas